Sinanköy is a village in the Lalapaşa District of Edirne Province in Turkey.

References

Villages in Lalapaşa District